DS Automobiles is a French luxury-premium vehicle marque of Automobiles Citroën S.A., a subsidiary ultimately owned by Stellantis. The independent DS marque was created in 2014 from the former DS subbrand and line of models of Citroën cars made since 2009, although had been separated from Citroën in Asia since 2012.

DS can be an abbreviation of Different Spirit or Distinctive Series, although it is also considered a nod to the classic executive car Citroën DS. The name is also a play on words, as in French it is pronounced like the word , meaning "goddess".

History 

The PSA Group originally consisted of three automobile brands, Peugeot, Citroën and the soon dropped Talbot, but none was considered a "premium" brand. Since 1976, PSA has experimented with differentiating the brands by price level, similar to Chevrolet/Buick or Volkswagen/Audi, but neither brand had the strength to justify premium pricing. By launching the DS line, Groupe PSA decided to build on the design heritage of the original Citroën DS (1955–1975) designed by Flaminio Bertoni and André Lefèbvre.

The DS line started with the Citroën DS3 in the beginning of 2010, a small car based on the floorpan of the new C3. The DS3 is based on the concept of the Citroën C3 Pluriel model and the Citroën DS Inside concept car, and customisable with various roof colours that can contrast with the body panels. It was named 2010 Car of the Year by Top Gear Magazine, awarded first supermini four times in a row by the J.D. Power Satisfaction Survey UK, and the second most efficient supermini (Citroën DS3 1.6 eHDi 115 Airdream: True MPG 63.0mpg) by What Car? behind the Citroën C3.

In 2013, the Citroën DS3 was again the best-selling premium subcompact car with 40% of the market share in Europe. The DS series is deeply connected to Citroën, as the DS4, launched in 2010, is based on the 2008 Citroën Hypnos concept car and the DS5, following in 2011, is based on the concept car of 2005, the Citroën C-SportLounge.

According to PSA CEO Carlos Tavares, DS would keep using the same platforms and dealerships as other PSA models, but would distinguish itself from Citroën cars by using "separate manufacturing and engineering standards".

Logo 

The DS Automobiles rear badge is a new logo rather than the Citroën double chevron, and all have different styling compared to their equivalent Citroën car. This logo has been designed by Korean designer Jin Joo. Citroën produced several concept sports cars, with the fully working Citroën Survolt being badged as a DS. A 2014 concept car, the DS Divine, develops the Survolt prototype as the future sport coupé of the DS range.

China 

In China, DS vehicles have been sold in separate dealerships since 2014. DS models for sale in China were produced by the Changan PSA joint venture based in Shenzhen until May 2020, when the factory was acquired by the Baoneng Group. The DS 5LS and DS 6WR are only sold in China. With the facelift of the DS5 in 2015, the DS brand was also separated from the Citroën brand in Europe, and standalone DS dealerships are planned worldwide.

DS Store 

The DS Store is the dealership network of DS Automobiles. It was introduced in China in 2014, and in Europe in 2015.

Models

Current 

 DS 3 (formerly DS 3 Crossback)
 DS 7 (formerly DS 7 Crossback)
 DS 4
 DS 9

Discontinued 

 DS 3 (hatchback)
 DS 4 (hatchback)
 DS 4S
 DS 5
 DS 5LS
 DS 6

Concept cars 

 Citroën C-SportLounge (2008)
 Citroën Hypnos (2008), occasionally shown with DS emblem
 Citroën DS Inside (2009)
 Citroën REVOLTe (2009)
 Citroën DS High Rider (2010)
 Citroën Survolt (2010)
 Citroën DS4 Racing (2012)
 Citroën Numéro 9 (2012)
 DS Wild Rubis (2013)
 Citroën DS3 Cabrio Racing (2013)
 DS 5LS R (2014)
 Divine DS (2014)
 DS 3 & DS 3 Cabrio Ines de la Fressange Paris (2014)
 DS 4 Crossback (2015)
 DS E-Tense (2016)
 DS X E-Tense (2018)
 DS Code X (2019)
 DS Aero Sport Lounge (2020)
 DS E-Tense Performance (2022)

Gallery

Sales

Motorsport 
DS Performance is the competitions department of DS Automobiles, which it claims was established to accelerate the electrification transition of the brand. Although the department doesn't participate directly in motorsport by using partners instead, it assists with technological development of Formula E cars and related marketing activities.

Formula E 

DS partnered with Sir Richard Branson's Virgin Racing team for the second season of the FIA Formula E Championship. The team competed under the title of DS Virgin Racing, and finished in third place in the 2015/16 season, and fourth in the 2016/17 season.

For the 2018–19 Formula E Championship, DS moved to partner with Techeetah, ending its relationship with Virgin. The newly renamed DS Techeetah, using the DS E-Tense FE 19 powertrain, won both the drivers and teams championships with Jean-Eric Vergne becoming Formula E's first two time drivers champion. This feat was repeated in the following season with António Félix da Costa becoming driver's champion and DS Techeetah winning the teams title for 2019–20.

The partnership with Techeetah ended at the end of the 2021–22 Formula E World Championship, with DS then partnering with Team Penske to create DS Penske from the 2022–23 season.

References

External links 

 

Citroën
Stellantis
Vehicle manufacturing companies established in 2009
French companies established in 2009
Luxury motor vehicle manufacturers
Car brands